Eicochrysops pauliani is a butterfly in the family Lycaenidae. It is found on Madagascar. The habitat consists of forests.

References

Butterflies described in 1950
Eicochrysops
Butterflies of Africa